The Presidium of the Reichstag was a political office in the German Weimar Republic.

It consisted of the President of the Reichstag, First Deputy President, Second Deputy President and Third Deputy President. 
The President was elected on the proposal of the largest party by the members of the Reichstag and remained in office until a successor had been elected.

National Assembly (1919-1920)

Presidium elected on February 7, 1919

1. Legislative Session (1920-1924)

2. Legislative Session (1924)

3. Legislative Session (1924-1928)

4. Legislative Session (1928-1930)

5. Legislative Session (1930-1932)

6. Legislative Session (1932)

7. Legislative Session (1932-1933)

8. Legislative Session (1933)

Presidium elected on March 12, 1933

Sources

Political history of Germany
Reichstag